Alternative Tentacles is an American independent record label founded in 1979 by Jello Biafra and East Bay Ray. In 1998, Biafra's former bandmates sued him for unpaid royalties and severed their ties with the label.

Key

List of releases

United States Discography

References

General

Specific

External links
Alternative Tentacles at Discogs

Discographies of American record labels